Elsloo is the name of two towns in the Netherlands:

 Elsloo, Friesland, Ooststellingwerf municipality
 Elsloo, Limburg, Stein municipality